The discography of Swedish DJ Axwell consists of two compilation albums, a remix album, an EP and nineteen singles. His discography as a member in the Swedish DJ supergroup Swedish House Mafia is more extensive as it includes two platinum-certified studio albums among other works. Axwell released his debut compilation album on 21 November 2008 via Blanco Y Negro. His second compilation album was released two years later via his own record label Axtone Records, on 13 June 2010.

Compilation albums

Remix albums

Extended plays

Singles

Remixes

Songwriting and production credits

Releases under an alias

As Axwell Λ Ingrosso (with Sebastian Ingrosso)

As Supermode (with Steve Angello)

As Swedish House Mafia (with Steve Angello and Sebastian Ingrosso)

Notes

See also 
Swedish House Mafia discography
Axwell & Ingrosso discography
Sebastian Ingrosso discography
Steve Angello discography

References 

Electronic music discographies
House music discographies
Discographies of Swedish artists